Club Baloncesto Illescas, was a Spanish basketball team based in Illescas, Castile-La Mancha.

History 
The original CB Illescas, founded in 1989, has got the record of six consecutive promotions from the lowest regional division in 2002–03 to LEB Oro, division where the team played in the 2008–09 season.

The club was also famous because in 2006–07 was signed Neil Fingleton, the tallest British-born man with 232 cm. The British center only played six games with CB Illescas.

In July 2011, Baloncesto Fuenlabrada announced their farm team compete in Liga EBA but out of Illescas. to playing in regional divisions.

After that, the town of Illescas decided to create a new team called CB Ilarcuris started to compete in the sixth division (Primera Autonómica), promoting in its first year to the Primera División. After its second season, the senior team did not enter any competition.

Season by season

Notable players
  Neil Fingleton
  Gustavo Ayón
  Bismack Biyombo

References

External links 
 Federación Española de Baloncesto
 Official CB Illescas page

Defunct basketball teams in Spain
Former LEB Oro teams
Basketball teams in Castilla–La Mancha
Former Liga EBA teams
Former LEB Plata teams
Basketball teams established in 1989
Basketball teams disestablished in 2011
Illescas, Toledo